Denys Rolle may refer to:

Denys Rolle (died 1638) of Stevenstone, Devon, Sheriff of Devon
Denys Rolle (died 1797) of Stevenstone, Devon, MP